Bertrand of Toulouse (or Bertrand of Tripoli) (died 1112) was count of Toulouse, and was the first count of Tripoli to rule in Tripoli itself.

Bertrand was the eldest son of Raymond IV of Toulouse, and had ruled Toulouse since Raymond left on the First Crusade in 1095. He was, between 1098 and 1100, dispossessed by his cousin Philippa and her husband Duke William IX of Aquitaine, who marched into Toulouse and captured it. Later they mortgaged it back to Bertrand in 1100 to fund Duke William's expedition to the Holy Land. Bertrand officially became count of Toulouse when Raymond died in 1105, and in 1108 he travelled to Tripoli to take control there as well. He deposed Raymond's nephew William-Jordan as nominal count of Tripoli in 1109, and with Baldwin I, king of Jerusalem, and a fleet of Genoese ships he captured Tripoli on 12 July.

Bertrand married Helie of Burgundy, daughter of Eudes I, in June 1095.

Bertrand ruled in Tripoli until his death in 1112. He was succeeded by his son Pons in Tripoli, and by his brother Alphonse-Jordan in Toulouse - although Toulouse was at that point again lost to Philippa and William.

Notes

References

1112 deaths
Counts of Tripoli
Counts of Toulouse
Margraves of Provence
Occitan nobility
12th-century rulers in Europe
Year of birth unknown